Live is an album of live recordings made by indie rock band Built to Spill on the band's Keep It Like a Secret tour in 1999. At the time the album was recorded, the band consisted of singer/guitarist Doug Martsch, guitarists Brett Netson, Jim Roth, bassist Brett Nelson, and drummer Scott Plouf. Live was released on the Warner Bros. label on April 18, 2000.

The model featured on the cover is Jeremy Atkins, a musician and an executive with Dark Horse Comics.

Track listing
 "The Plan" – 4:54
 "Randy Described Eternity" – 3:55
 "Stop the Show" – 4:15
 "Virginia Reel Around the Fountain" (Halo Benders) – 7:00
 "Cortez the Killer" (written by Neil Young) – 20:30
 "Car" – 3:07
 "Singing Sores Make Perfect Swords" (Love as Laughter) – 3:33
 "I Would Hurt a Fly" – 5:24
 "Broken Chairs" – 19:05

Double-LP version
As a part of Built to Spill's contract with Warner Bros. Records, all of their Warner Bros. releases were released on vinyl LP by the band's former label, Up Records.  Two studio tracks, "Forget Remember When" and "Now and Then," are included as bonus tracks on the Up double-LP version.  These tracks had been previously released as part of the Carry the Zero CD single/EP.

The track listing for this version is:

Side One:
 "The Plan" – 4:54
 "Randy Described Eternity" – 3:55
 "Stop the Show" – 4:15
 "Virginia Reel Around the Fountain" – 7:00
Side Two:
 "Cortez the Killer" – 20:30
Side Three:
 "Car" – 3:07
 "Singing Sores Make Perfect Swords" – 3:33
 "I Would Hurt a Fly" – 5:24
 "Forget Remember When" – 4:23
 "Now and Then" – 5:24
Side Four:
 "Broken Chairs" – 19:05

References

Built to Spill albums
2000 live albums
Warner Records live albums
Albums produced by Phil Ek